Zachary Jones (born 15 March 1995) is a professional Australian rules footballer playing for the St Kilda Football Club in the Australian Football League (AFL).

Early life
Zachary is the younger brother of former Melbourne captain Nathan Jones. Jones played for the Dandenong Stringrays in the TAC Cup and was a joint-winner of the Most Valuable Player for Vic Country at the 2013 AFL Under 18 Championships and was named in the All-Australian team. 

He was recruited by the Sydney Swans with the 15th overall selection in the 2013 national draft.

AFL Career

Sydney Swans
He made his senior debut against , at the MCG in round 14 of the 2014 AFL season.

In 2016, he was able to overcome an ankle injury and a severe concussion through the season, and was selected to play in the 2016 AFL Grand Final, cementing himself a spot in the team.

Swans CEO Tom Harley said of Jones "everyone knows within footy circles he comes from a really strong and tight family and his desire to return to Victoria is to be closer to his family. St Kilda is the club that has expressed interest and Zak has let us know that, he has been really transparent about that...We actually had some challenges in re-signing him last time so this wasn’t totally unexpected."

St Kilda FC
Jones made his St Kilda debut in Round 1 of the 2020 AFL Season against North Melbourne. Jones was one of the best-on-ground in the Saints' round two win over the Western Bulldogs, collecting 29 disposals and a goal in a match with shortened 16-minute quarters. Jones left the field early in the Saints' Round 4 win against Richmond, and missed the Round 5 win against Carlton as a result. Jones eventually managed 16 of a possible 19 games (including two finals for nine wins and seven losses) in his first year at the Saints, finishing sixth in the Trevor Barker Award. 

Jones suffered a hamstring injury in the 2021 pre-season and did not participate in the Saints' pre-season matches. Jones had a career best game in round seven against Hawthorn, winning the Silk-Miller Memorial Medal in the Blue Ribbon Cup game and collecting 37 disposals, two goals, six tackles, eight marks and had 13 score involvements. The following week, against Gold Coast, Jones had 31 disposals and laid seven tackles to be amongst the Saints' best in their round eight win. In mid-May, Jones ruptured his right quad at training ahead of round nine. He underwent surgery and was unavailable for selection for approximately eight weeks. Despite the injuries, Jones returned immediately to the side Round 17 and having a big impact, collecting twenty-six disposals (13 contested) and a game-high 10 clearances from just over 60 percent game-time. Jones ultimately played seven consecutive games to see out the season, including a prolific 32-disposal game against West Coast and a strong 30 disposal game against Carlton. Of his return to the side despite injury, teammate Seb Ross stated that "every time Jonesy’s had an injury, he’s basically nearly returned straight into the AFL team off just the work he’s been able to do in rehab. You don’t see that too often. The way he attacks his rehab and prepares his mind and body to be able to come straight in and not look out of place with his run and drive is a real credit to his professionalism."

Statistics
 Statistics are correct to the end of round 7, 2022

|- style="background-color: #EAEAEA"
! scope="row" style="text-align:center" | 2014
|
| 10 || 4 || 1 || 0 || 11 || 18 || 29 || 3 || 7 || 0.3 || 0.0 || 2.8 || 4.5 || 7.3 || 0.8 || 1.8 || 0
|- 
|-
! scope="row" style="text-align:center" | 2015
|
| 10 || 11 || 0 || 0 || 69 || 49 || 118 || 20 || 27 || 0.0 || 0.0 || 6.3 || 4.5 || 10.7 || 1.8 || 2.5 || 0
|- style="background-color: #EAEAEA"
! scope="row" style="text-align:center" | 2016
|
| 10 || 16 || 3 || 1 || 153 || 85 || 238 || 33 || 52 || 0.2 || 0.1 || 9.6 || 5.3 || 14.9 || 2.1 || 3.3 || 0
|-
! scope="row" style="text-align:center" | 2017
|
| 10 || 23 || 10 || 6 || 256 || 202 || 458 || 109 || 79 || 0.4 || 0.3 || 11.1 || 8.8 || 19.9 || 4.7 || 3.4 || 2
|- style="background-color: #EAEAEA"
! scope="row" style="text-align:center" | 2018
|
| 10 || 19 || 6 || 3 || 194 || 176 || 370 || 76 || 35 || 0.3 || 0.2 || 10.2 || 9.3 || 19.5 || 4.0 || 1.8 || 0
|-
! scope="row" style="text-align:center" | 2019
|
| 10 || 17 || 3 || 7 || 217 || 163 || 380 || 68 || 66 || 0.2 || 0.4 || 12.8 || 9.6 || 22.4 || 4.0 || 3.9 || 0
|- style="background-color: #EAEAEA"
! scope="row" style="text-align:center" | 2020
|
| 3 || 16 || 5 || 8 || 157 || 147 || 304 || 47 || 57 || 0.3 || 0.5 || 9.8 || 9.2 || 19.0 || 2.9 || 3.6 || 7
|- 
! scope="row" style="text-align:center" | 2021
|
| 3 || 13 || 4 || 2 || 163|| 141|| 304|| 49|| 57 || 0.3 || 0.2 || 12.5 || 10.8 || 23.4 || 3.8 || 4.4 || 4
|- style="background-color: #EAEAEA"
! scope="row" style="text-align:center" | 2022
|
| 3 || 0 || – || – || – || – || – || – || – || – || – || – || – || – || – || – || –
|- class="sortbottom"
! colspan=3| Career
! 119
! 32
! 27
! 1220
! 981
! 2201
! 405
! 380
! 0.3
! 0.2
! 10.3
! 8.2
! 18.5
! 3.4
! 3.2
! 13
|}

Notes

Injuries
 Zak got injured against North Melbourne in 2019, tweaking his left hamstring after receiving a shove from Jed Anderson.
 Jones in 2016 missed 4-6weeks after a high ankle sprain which he suffered in a match against Hawthorn at the SCG

References

External links

1995 births
Living people
Dandenong Stingrays players
Australian rules footballers from Victoria (Australia)
Sydney Swans players
St Kilda Football Club players